Ghioroc Lake (Lacul Ghioroc in Romanian) is a man-made lake located in Ghioroc, Arad County, Romania. The lake has several land patches away from the coastline, which are used as holidays resorts or for clubbing.

The lake is divided into two sides, "Ghioroc 1" and "Ghioroc 2". The second side, Ghioroc 2, is the only side opened for tourists. The first side is still being preserved as a mining point.

History
The lake has been created as a result of mining. In the 1960s in the Socialist Romania, Ghioroc Lake used to be a point of extraction for gravel and other aggregates. The lake has been extensively used for this purpose up until the '80s, when such materials were no longer needed. Large amounts of sand and gravel are still extracted from the adjacent Ghioroc 2 gravelpit, and from a new pit currently being exploited nearby.

In the early 1990s, the lake has been opened for tourists, although it has not been officially recognized as a touristic destination. Due to the high level of pollution and remaining of the exploitation, the lake was temporarily shut down and all the remaining waste has been cleared out.

In the 2000s, the lake has been officially added as a touristic attraction in the Arad County. The lake has been completely cleaned up and an artificial beach has been created. Fish have also been added for the purpose of reproduction, but also to populate the lake.

Tourism
Lake Ghioroc is essential for the economy of Ghioroc. It brings a considerable amount of income to the town.

It is mostly popular for tourists, as plenty come during the summer. It is estimated that hundreds of tourists visit it, on an average summer day.

There are a few shops and restaurants on its southern shore. There is also a parking facility.

Although the beach is artificial, the sand comes from the lake itself.

Unfortunately, access to the lake is gradually being reduced by sale of large portions of the shoreline, and erecting fences to prevent access. At the same time, easy access to the beaches is reduced by digging them up, or covering the sand with soil. Access to the North side of the lake has been seriously impeded by ploughing the adjoining land right up to the edge of the lake.

Fishing
Lake Ghioroc has two main species of fish: crappies and roach. Fishing is allowed, under the laws of Romania.

The lake is a popular destination among fishermen, because of the accessible location of the lake.

There have been several fishing contests being held at this lake.

Nautical sports
Lake Ghioroc can also be used for practicing nautical sports. Windsurfing and diving are performed there, due to the high winds and size/depth of the lake.

Depth controversy
The maximum depth of Lake Ghioroc is controversial. It is a local legend that says that no one has ever reached the bottom of the lake.

References

Lakes of Romania
Artificial lakes
Geography of Arad County
Tourist attractions in Arad County